The 1979 Dayton Pro Tennis Classic, was a men's tennis tournament played on indoor carpet courts at the Dayton Convention Center in Dayton, Ohio, in the United States that was part of the 1979 Grand Prix. It was the sixth edition of the event and was held from March 26 through April 1, 1979. Unseeded Butch Walts won his second singles title at the event after 1975 and earned $13,000 first-prize money.

Finals

Singles
 Butch Walts defeated  Marty Riessen 6–3, 6–4
 It was Walts' 1st singles title of the year and the 3rd of his career.

Doubles
 Bruce Manson /  Cliff Drysdale defeated  Ross Case /  Phil Dent 3–6, 6–3, 7–6(7–1)

References

External links
 ITF tournament edition details

1979 in American tennis
1979 in sports in Ohio
March 1979 sports events in the United States